Makopong is a village in Kgalagadi District of Botswana. It is located close to the border with South Africa. The population was 1,697 in the 2011 census.

References

Kgalagadi District
Villages in Botswana
Botswana–South Africa border crossings